Anderson's Oldfield mouse (Thomasomys andersoni) is a species of rodent in the family Cricetidae.

References

Thomasomys
Mammals described in 2007